Events from the year 1180 in Ireland.

Incumbents
Lord: John

Events

Construction of Carrickfergus Castle begins.
St Mary’s Cathedral built in Limerick.

Births

Deaths
 14 November – Laurence O’Toole
Muirgheas Ua hEidhin, King of Uí Fiachrach Aidhne

References